Curral Grande is a settlement in the western part of the island of Fogo, Cape Verde. It is situated 8 km northeast of the island capital São Filipe. In 2010 its population was 398. The village sits at 289 meters above sea level.

See also
List of villages and settlements in Cape Verde

References

Villages and settlements in Fogo, Cape Verde
São Filipe, Cape Verde